The 2010 Grey Power World Cup of Curling took place at the WFCU Centre in Windsor, Ontario from November 3–7, as part of the 2010 World Curling Tour. It was the first Grand Slam event for the 2010–11 curling season.

The 2010 World Cup featured 18 teams competing in 3 groups in a round-robin tournament format, with the top 8 teams advancing to the quarterfinals. The purse for this event was CAD$100,000. The winner of the tournament was the Mike McEwen rink which received CAD$22,500. It was McEwen's first slam title. He defeated Jeff Stoughton 4-2 in an all-Winnipeg final.

Teams

Round robin

Standings

Results
All times shown are in Eastern Standard Time.

Draw 1
Wednesday, November 3, 7:30 pm

Draw 2
Thursday, November 4, 10:00 am

Draw 3
Thursday, November 4, 1:30 pm

Draw 4
Thursday, November 4, 5:00 pm

Draw 5
Thursday, November 4, 8:30pm

Draw 6
Friday, November 5, 10:00 am

Draw 7
Friday, November 5, 1:30 pm

Draw 8
Friday, November 5, 5:00 pm

Draw 9
Friday, November 5, 8:30 pm

Tiebreakers
Saturday, November 6, 11:00 am

Playoffs

Quarterfinals
Saturday, November 6, 3:00 pm

Semifinals
Saturday, November 6, 7:00 pm

Final
Sunday, November 7, 1:00 pm

Notes

External links
Official Site of the Event
WCT Event Site
The WFCU Centre

Masters (curling)
Sports competitions in Windsor, Ontario
2010 in Canadian curling
Curling in Ontario
2010 in Ontario